The Van Bosse–Fock cabinet was the cabinet of the Netherlands from 4 June 1868 until 4 January 1871. The cabinet was formed by Independent Liberals (Ind. Lib.). The Centre-right cabinet was a minority government in the House of Representatives. Independent Liberal Pieter Philip van Bosse was Prime Minister.

Cabinet members

 Resigned.
 Served ad interim.

References

External links
Official

  Kabinet-Van Bosse/Fock Parlement & Politiek

Cabinets of the Netherlands
1868 establishments in the Netherlands
Cabinets established in 1868
Cabinets disestablished in 1871
Minority governments